Natalya Yuryevna Anisimova, née Guskova,  born 16 November 1960, is a Russian former handball player who competed for the Soviet Union in the 1988 Summer Olympics and for the Unified Team in the 1992 Summer Olympics.

In 1982 she won World Championship in Hungary.

In 1988 she won the bronze medal with the Soviet team. She played all five matches and scored 13 goals.

Four years later she was a member of the Unified Team which won the bronze medal. She played one match.

External links
Profile

1960 births
Living people
Soviet female handball players
Russian female handball players
Olympic handball players of the Soviet Union
Olympic handball players of the Unified Team
Handball players at the 1988 Summer Olympics
Handball players at the 1992 Summer Olympics
Olympic bronze medalists for the Soviet Union
Olympic bronze medalists for the Unified Team
Olympic medalists in handball
Medalists at the 1992 Summer Olympics
Medalists at the 1988 Summer Olympics
Honoured Masters of Sport of the USSR